South Stormont is a township in eastern Ontario, Canada, in the United Counties of Stormont, Dundas and Glengarry. South Stormont borders on, but does not include, the city of Cornwall.

Communities
The township of South Stormont comprises a number of villages and hamlets, including the following communities:

 Cornwall Township: Beaver Glen, Bonville, Harrison's Corners, Long Sault, Northfield, Rosedale Terrace, St. Andrews West; Black River, McMillans Corners (partially), Sandfield Mills; Churchill Heights, Northfield Station, Lakeview Heights,
 Osnabruck Township: Ingleside, Lunenburg, Newington, Osnabruck Centre; Ault Island, Bush Glen, Bunker Hill, Dixon, Gallingertown, North Lunenburg, North Valley, Pleasant Valley, Sandtown; Cedar Grove,

In addition, the township would have been home to the nine Lost Villages which were flooded to create the St. Lawrence Seaway:

 Maple Grove, Mille Roches, Moulinette, Sheek's Island in Cornwall Township
 Aultsville, Dickinson's Landing, Farran's Point, Santa Cruz, Wales, Woodlands in Osnabruck Township

Local government
The township of South Stormont is governed by three councillors, a deputy mayor and a mayor (reeve). The term length is four years. South Stormont also conducts elections on the internet, using a secure, cost-efficient website and an automated telephone voting system.

Mayor - Bryan McGillis 
Deputy Mayor - Andrew Guindon 
Councillor - Reid McIntyre
Councillor - Jennifer MacIsaac
Councillor - Cindy Woods

The South Stormont Town Hall and administrative offices are located in Long Sault.

History
Cornwall and Osnabruck were two of the original eight "Royal Townships" established along the Saint Lawrence River in Upper Canada. Cornwall was named for King George III's eldest son, Prince George, Prince of Wales, who also held the title of Duke of Cornwall.  Osnabruck was named after a title formerly held by the King's second son, Prince Frederick, who at one time was Prince-Bishop of Osnabrück in Lower Saxony.

This area was first settled by members of Sir John Johnson's King's Royal Regiment of New York, and became Stormont County in 1792.

The Lost Villages, ten ghost towns which were flooded by the construction of the Saint Lawrence Seaway in 1958, were located in the former Cornwall and Osnabruck Townships. The communities of Long Sault and Ingleside were newly built to accommodate displaced residents of the flooded villages. Due to this relocation, the towns were entirely planned from their inception – a rarity in Ontario. Several streets in the two communities are named for the flooded settlements.

The township was established on January 1, 1998, with the amalgamation of the former Townships of Cornwall and Osnabruck. Jim Brownell was its first reeve.

Demographics 

Notable residents

Burial place of Simon Fraser, famous Canadian explorer.
NHL player Jesse Winchester.

See also
List of townships in Ontario
List of francophone communities in Ontario

References

External links

Lower-tier municipalities in Ontario
Municipalities in the United Counties of Stormont, Dundas and Glengarry
Township municipalities in Ontario
Ontario populated places on the Saint Lawrence River
Populated places established in 1998
1998 establishments in Ontario